The Revolution Betrayed: What Is the Soviet Union and Where Is It Going? is a book published in 1937 by the exiled Soviet Bolshevik leader Leon Trotsky. This work analyzed and criticized the course of historical development in the Soviet Union following the death of Vladimir Lenin in 1924 and is regarded as Trotsky's primary work dealing with the nature of Stalinism. The book was written  by Trotsky during his exile in Norway and was originally translated into Spanish by Victor Serge. The most widely available English translation is by Max Eastman.

Historical background
Leon Trotsky (Lev Davidovich Bronstein, 1879–1940) was one of the leaders of the October Revolution in 1917, which installed the Bolsheviks to power in Russia. In 1900, as the leading Marxist theoretician and revolutionary, Trotsky was exiled to Siberia for his socialist activities against the Russian Empire. In 1905, after a European exile, Trotsky returned to Russia for the abortive 1905 Russian Revolution, where his oratory made him a leading figure in the Saint Petersburg Soviet, until the Tsarist police arrested him in December. After again escaping Tsarist Russia for continental Europe, for a decade Trotsky politically transitioned from supporting the Menshevik wing of the RSDLP to advocating for the unity of the warring factions in 1913 with the establishment of the Mezhraiontsy, the Interdistrict Organization of United Social Democrats.

The virtual collapse of the old regime during the latter part of World War I helped to motivate the Mezhraiontsy to make amends with their Bolshevik rivals, headed by Vladimir Lenin, and early in 1917 Trotsky returned from exile in New York City by way of Canada to join forces as a member of the Bolshevik party's governing Central Committee. Trotsky was instrumental in laying the groundwork for the 7 November 1917 (25 October 1917 O.S.) seizure of power from the Russian Provisional Government headed by Alexander Kerensky, taking over as head of the Petrograd Soviet early in October and building that institution's Military-Revolutionary Committee into a revolutionary fighting force.

Following the successful overthrow of the Kerensky government, Trotsky was named the first People's Commissar of Foreign Affairs of the RSFSR of Soviet Russia. In April 1918, Trotsky was named People's Commissar for War and the Navy, in which capacity he helped to construct the Red Army that would defend the new regime against anti-Bolshevik factions in the Russian Civil War.

Lenin's retirement from active political life in the aftermath of a series of strokes in 1923 followed by his death in January 1924 ushered in an interregnum during which several leading candidates jockeyed for supremacy. Lenin's longtime associate and Communist International chief Grigory Zinoviev, Moscow party leader Lev Kamenev, nationalities expert and party organization secretary Joseph Stalin, and military leader Trotsky represented the leading contenders for party and state primacy. The eloquent Trotsky was identified by the three other leading contenders to the throne as a most serious political threat and a temporary alliance was formed by the trio against Trotsky.

Over the next several years Trotsky and his supporters were successively marginalized and isolated by the evolving Soviet leadership group, with Trotsky vilified as a political oppositionist and his supporters atomized by political and police pressure. This process was accentuated by successive exiles of Trotsky, first in 1928 to the remote city of Alma Ata in Soviet Central Asia followed the next year by Trotsky's physical expulsion from the Soviet Union to Turkey.

Although separated from his dwindling band of committed followers in the USSR, Trotsky continued to function as an opposition political leader from exile throughout the rest of his life. This ongoing political activity against the regime headed by Joseph Stalin led to ongoing political pressure by the Soviet government against a series of host countries in which Trotsky had sought exile.

The writing development

In the spring of 1935 a beleaguered Trotsky formally sought political asylum in the Scandinavian kingdom of Norway with an appeal to the Labour Party government in power. The Norwegian response was slow, and only in early June was Trotsky at last notified that his request had been granted and that he was to proceed to the Norwegian embassy in Paris to obtain a visa. Norwegian politics intervened before Trotsky was able to obtain this document, however, and the visa approval was revoked by the time Trotsky arrived at the embassy on June 10. French police, suspecting a ruse by Trotsky to obtain residence in Paris, from which he had been banned, immediately ordered Trotsky out of the city. Trotsky's planned voyage to Norway was abruptly canceled.

Norwegian authorities demanded that Trotsky obtain a permit for reentry into France before a visa for travel to Norway would be granted. Finally, after a burst of correspondence and negotiation, the demand for an unobtainable French re-entry permit was dropped and Trotsky was allowed a limited six month visa to enter Norway. As was the case with the terms previously set by the French government, the Norwegian government reserved for itself the right to determine Trotsky's place of residence and to exclude him from the capital city of Oslo. He arrived on June 18, 1935.

The Revolution Betrayed was completed and sent to the publisher on 4 August 1936, immediately prior to the sensational public announcement of the first of three great public Moscow trials generated by the secret police terror known to history as the "Great Purge" (Yezhovshchina). When Trotsky became aware of the trial, which would ultimately end in the execution of Grigory Zinoviev, Lev Kamenev, and other prominent Soviet political figures, a short postscript was tagged on to his introduction in which Trotsky claimed that his current book constituted "advance exposure" of the Stalin regime's effort at "deliberate mystification".

Content
The Revolution Betrayed has been characterized by historian Baruch Knei-Paz as Trotsky's "major work on Stalinism" and constituted the chief primary source for a chapter length summary of Trotsky's thinking on bureaucracy in a seminal 1978 intellectual survey.

In the view of Knei-Paz, the subtitle chosen by Trotsky for The Revolution Betrayed"What is the Soviet Union and where is it going?"accurately summarized the author's intent behind the book. Trotsky was preoccupied with the question of whether the emerging bureaucratic political and economic formation in the USSR constituted a new social model not encompassed previously by Marxist doctrine. Knei-Paz asserted that while Trotsky insisted that the Soviet system did not constitute any such new social and economic system, in reality the analysis he presented in The Revolution Betrayed was, in fact, "ambivalent".

The book is a wide-ranging critique of the USSR and its rulers, and advocates a new political revolution to overthrow the Stalinist dictatorship and bring about a socialist democracy. It opens by praising the positive economic advances of the USSR since the death of Lenin, citing growth in electrical power, agricultural output, industry, etc. It then proceeds to describe the limits on this economic advance, the nature of the new ruling elite, and predicts the ultimate downfall of the Soviet Union as a result of Stalinist rule. It places an emphasis on a Marxist method of analysis, and makes several key observations and predictions, some of which would only be borne out many decades later.

The first few chapters examine the "zigzags", as Trotsky describes them, in the policy pursued by the Communist Party, citing rapid panicked changes in policy as a direct result of a lack of democracy. Trotsky highlights the most important of these "zigzags" in the field of economic policy, criticizing Stalin and Nikolai Bukharin's policy of at first opposing voluntary collectivization and increasing privatization of land and then of an abrupt reversal of policy towards rapid industrialization and forced collectivization, which Trotsky brands "economic adventurism" that carried "the nation to the edge of disaster". Trotsky then discusses labor productivity and criticizes the uselessness of the Stakhanovite movement and "shock brigades".

Trotsky then analyzes the "Soviet Thermidor" (Thermidor is a reference to the later stages of the French Revolution, when conservative forces took hold of society). He analyzes the triumph of Stalin, the separation of the party from Bolshevism, and the rising bureaucratic stratum. The importance of this chapter lies in Trotsky's observation that the ruling stratum in the USSR are neither capitalists nor workers, but rather a section of the working class alienated from its class roots, influenced both by the bureaucracy left over from the Tsarist era and the de-politicisation of the working class.

Trotsky refers to Stalinism as a form of "Bonapartism", drawing a comparison with the French dictator Napoleon Bonaparte and his capture of the French state after that country's revolution. Just as Bonaparte brought back the trappings of the aristocracy and imprisoned capitalists despite presiding over a new capitalist social system, Stalin imprisons workers and behaves like a Tsar despite failing to overturn the gains of a planned economy and nominal public ownership. At the same time, Trotsky writes that this ruling stratum impoverishes the rest of society, asserting that "a planned economy requires democracy just as the human body requires oxygen"; without democracy, he predicts economic stagnation.

He next discusses everyday life in the Soviet Union, economic inequality and the oppression of the new proletariat. He links the increasing conservatism in the treatment of women and the family directly with the rise of Stalinism, and compares it to the period before the revolution. From here he discusses foreign policy and the Soviet military: the failure to defeat fascism, the re-institution of ranks and the loss of a militia, and closes by examining the future of the Soviet Union.

One of the predictions made by Trotsky was that the USSR would come before a disjuncture: either the toppling of the ruling bureaucracy by means of a political revolution, or capitalist restoration led by the bureaucracy. This prediction was made at a time when most commentators, capitalist and Stalinist, predicted the continued rise of Soviet power. As Allin Cottrell and Paul Cockshott would later write in their 1992 book Towards a New Socialism, Trotsky's prediction proved prescient. Lack of economic democracy coupled with computer technology that (at the time) was not yet advanced enough to plan the economy led to economic stagnation in the 1960s and 1970s (Era of Stagnation). Leading members of the ruling party (who were overwhelmingly from the more privileged stratum of Soviet society) responded to the stagnation by promoting capitalist reforms in the 1980s, rather than expanding more democratic forms of socialism.

List of English-language editions
Sources: Louis Sinclair, Trotsky: A Bibliography: Volume 2. Aldershot, England: Scolar Press, 1989; pp. 1281-1282; ABEBooks.com; OCLC WorldCat.

 New York: Doubleday, Doran & Co., 1937. —308 pages.
 London: Faber and Faber, 1937. —Includes I Stake My LIfe. 312 pages.
 New York: Pioneer Publishers, 1945. —Facsimile of 1st American edition.
 New York and London: Pioneer Publishers, 1957. —Facsimile of 1st American edition.
 New York: Pioneer Press, 1964. —Facsimile of 1st American edition.
 New York: Merit Publishers, 1965. —Facsimile of 1st American edition.
 London: New Park Publishers, 1967. —Facsimile of 1st American edition.
 New York: Merit Publishers, 1969. —Facsimile of 1st American edition.
 New York: Merit Publishers, 1970. —Facsimile of 1st American edition.
 New York: Pathfinder Press, 1972. —Facsimile of 1st American edition.
 London: New Park Publishers, 1973. —334 pages.
 New York: Pathfinder Press, 1977. —Facsimile of 1st American edition.
 New York: Pathfinder Press, 1983. —Facsimile of 1st American edition.
 New York: Pathfinder Press, 1987. —Facsimile of 1st American edition.
 Detroit: Labor Publications/Mehring Books, 1991.
 Mineola, NY: Dover Publications, 2004.
 New York: Pathfinder Press, 2004. —Facsimile of 1st American edition.

See also
 List of books by Leon Trotsky

References

External links
 The Revolution Betrayed, Marxists Internet Archive, www.marxists.org/
 The Revolution Betrayed, scanned version in PDF format of the 1937 American printing
 After Ten Years: On Trotsky’s The Revolution Betrayed by C.L.R. James (1946)
 The Revolution Betrayed by Tony Cliff (1993).

1937 non-fiction books
Communist books
Works by Leon Trotsky
Books about the Soviet Union
Books about the Russian Revolution
Books about Trotskyism